The Daily Times (DT) is an English-language Pakistani newspaper. Launched on April 9, 2002, Daily Times, is simultaneously published from Lahore, Islamabad and Karachi. The newspaper was owned by Governor of Punjab and Pakistan Peoples Party member Salmaan Taseer.

Staff and columnists
The Daily Times is a newspaper that advocates liberal and secular ideas. The Daily Times is listed as a member publication on the All Pakistan Newspapers Society website.

Notable contributors & columnists for the Daily Times include:

Mir Hadi Abbas
Iftikhar Ahmad
Ali Salman Alvi
Rizwan Asghar
Waheed Babar
Ziyad Broker
Asad Ejaz Butt
Qasir M. Chaudhry
Zafar Hilaly
Hannan R. Hussain
Mohammad Jamil
Hassan Khan
Lal Khan
Naveed Aman Khan
Suleman Khanzada
Noman Nayyir Kulachvi
Saulat Nagi
Haider Rifaat
Farman Nawaz 
Shaheer Ahmad Piracha
Ally Adnan
Aurangzeb Qureshi
Hasan Askari Rizvi
Faraz Saeed
M. Aamer Sarfraz
S P Seth
Raja Omer Shabbir
Haider Shah
M. Khalid Shaikh
Obed Suhail
Ali Tahir
Sabbah Uddin

See also

 List of newspapers in Pakistan
The Friday Times

References

External links
 

English-language newspapers published in Pakistan
Daily newspapers published in Pakistan
Newspapers established in 2002
2002 establishments in Pakistan